The Junee Shire is a local government area in the Riverina region of New South Wales, Australia. It was formed on 1 January 1981 from the amalgamation of the Municipality of Junee and Illabo Shire resulting from the Local Government Areas Amalgamation Act 1980.

The Shire includes the town of Junee and the small towns of Bethungra, Illabo, Wantabadgery, Harefield, Old Junee, Junee Reefs, Dirnaseer and Eurongilly.

The mayor of Junee Shire is Cr. Neil Smith, an independent politician.

Council

Current composition and election method
Junee Shire Council is composed of nine councillors elected proportionally as a single ward. All councillors are elected for a fixed four-year term of office. The mayor is usually elected by the councillors each September. The most recent council election was held on 4 December 2021, having been delayed from 2020 due to the COVID-19 pandemic, the makeup of the council is as follows:

The current Council, elected in 2021, in order of election, is:

Previous election results 
The prior Council, elected in 2016, in order of election, was:

Gallery

References

 
Local government areas of the Riverina
Local government areas of New South Wales
1981 establishments in Australia